Eagle Pass is a city in and the county seat of Maverick County in the U.S. state of Texas. Its population was 28,130 as of the 2020 census.

Eagle Pass borders the city of Piedras Negras, Coahuila, Mexico, which is to the southwest and across the Rio Grande. The Eagle Pass-Piedras Negras metropolitan area (EP-PN) is one of six binational metropolitan areas along the United States-Mexican border. As of January 2008, according to the US census, the EPPN's population was 48,401 people, and the Piedras Negras metropolitan area's population was 169,771.

History
Eagle Pass was the first American settlement on the Rio Grande. Originally known as Camp Eagle Pass, it served as a temporary outpost for the Texas militia, which had been ordered to stop illegal trade with Mexico during the Mexican–American War. Eagle Pass is so named because the contour of the hills through which the Rio Grande flows bore a fancied resemblance to the outstretched wings of an eagle.

General William Leslie Cazneau (1807–1876) founded the Eagle Pass townsite in the 1840s.

In 1850, Rick Pawless opened a trading post called Eagle Pass. In 1871, Maverick County was established, and Eagle Pass was named the county seat. During the remainder of the 19th century, schools and churches opened, the mercantile and ranching industries grew, and a railway was built.

Lawsuit

The City of Eagle Pass was sued by the US government in 2008 to gain access to the land and construct a fence on the United States-Mexico border.

Maverick County corruption scandal

An ongoing public corruption, bid-rigging, and kickback investigation by the FBI and Texas Department of Public Safety has resulted in the arrest and imprisonment of all four Maverick County commissioners, one justice of the peace, and several local government employees and businessmen since October 2012, making it the largest public criminal probe in Eagle Pass and Maverick County history. On February 20, 2015, a federal grand jury in Del Rio indicted a county commissioner and a former county justice of the peace in connection with an alleged bribery, kickback, and bid-rigging scheme, all related to the ongoing public corruption investigation. On February 23, 2015, former Maverick County Commissioner Rodolfo Heredia was sentenced to 10 years in federal prison, followed by three years of supervised release, and ordered to perform 1,200 hours of community service after completing his prison term. He was also ordered to pay a maximum of $56,003.88 in restitution to Maverick County.

City of Eagle Pass gasoline card theft and fraud

On August 8, 2012, a federal grand jury in the U.S. District Court in Del Rio indicted five Eagle Pass residents, including a former Public Works Department employee, in connection with an estimated $70,000 credit-card fraud scheme. According to the indictment, during 2011, City of Eagle Pass employee Edgar Aguilar obtained five City of Eagle Pass-owned Fuelman credit cards designated for fuel purchases for Public Works department vehicles and distributed them to his accomplices to purchase fuel for their own vehicles and to purchase fuel for others at the city's expense. In some instances, defendants charged individuals a reduced rate for fuel purchased using the city's credit card and then pocketed the cash. On November 29, 2012, Aguilar entered a guilty plea for the charges of theft and fraud, and on May 15, 2013, was sentenced to 42 months in federal prison and ordered to pay $68,373.87 in restitution for his role in the fraudulent scheme.

Former city manager charged with lying to the FBI

On March 30, 2017, Hector Chavez Sr., the former Eagle Pass city manager, pleaded guilty to lying to the FBI regarding a bribery scheme involving public contracts in Maverick County. Chavez, with the company Chace Management, was charged with receiving $20,000 from the owner of the engineering firm Hejl, Lee, and Associates to bribe a county commissioner  to procure a $270,000 contract for the engineering firm. Chavez admitted to having given false information in 2015. Chavez was sentenced to 42 months in federal prison and three years' supervised release on August 21, 2017.

Economy

The City of Eagle Pass is home to small and large businesses alike, but its primary sectors are in retail, import/export and manufacturing. Two of its largest manufacturers are Mossberg and MicroStar. In fact, it was in 2014 when Maverick Arms decided to expand to Eagle Pass after it received assistance from the State of Texas using the Texas Enterprise Fund.

The City of Eagle Pass and Maverick County recently adopted matching incentives policies (2020) making it easier for outside business to expand operations in the region. Incentives are handled through the City's Economic Development Department.

Because of its location along the U.S./Mexico border, the retail sector is healthy due to the large number of visitors Eagle Pass gets from within Mexico. It is estimated that on a regular weekday, Eagle Pass gets 6,000 people come across into the U.S. vs. 10,000 on the weekend. Many of these visitors stay within the city limits to shop and eat at local restaurants.

Climate
Eagle Pass has a hot semi-arid climate (Köppen: BSh). Most precipitation occurs in the spring through fall with a drier winter. The highest monthly average precipitation occurs in September, with a secondary peak in May and June. Late July and August demonstrate a significant, secondary dry season, with very high temperatures and high sun exposure, resulting in high evaporation rates.

Geography
Eagle Pass is located at  (28.710622, −100.489331).

According to the United States Census Bureau, the city has a total area of 7.4 mi2 (19.2 km2), of which 0.04 mi2 (0.1 km2) (0.40%) is covered by water.

The area is served by U.S. Routes 57 and 277, and Farm-to-Market Road 481. Maverick County Memorial International Airport is a general-aviation field. The nearest commercial air service is 50 miles away, via the Del Rio International Airport in Del Rio, which is served by American Airlines.

Demographics

2020 census

As of the 2020 United States census, there were 28,130 people, 8,850 households, and 7,053 families residing in the city.

2006
As of the census of 2006, 24,847 people, 6,925 households, and 5,588 families resided in the city. The population density was 3,030.3 people/sq mi (1,169.4/km2). The 7,613 housing units averaged 1,029.3/sq mi (397.2/km2). The racial makeup of the city was 42.73% White, 0.27% African American, 0.39% Native American, 0.76% Asian, 22.71% from other races, and 3.13% from two or more races. Hispanics or Latinos of any race were 96.90% of the population.

Of the 6,925 households, 43.5% had children under the age of 18 living with them, 59.0% were married couples living together, 18.3% had a female householder with no husband present, and 19.3% were not families. About 17.7% of all households were made up of individuals, and 9.5% had someone living alone who was 65 or older. The average household size was 3.22, and the average family size was 3.69.

In the city, the population was distributed as 32.7% under  18, 8.6% from 18 to 24, 25.6% from 25 to 44, 19.9% from 45 to 64, and 13.1% who were 65 or older. The median age was 32 years. For every 100 females, there were 88.5 males. For every 100 females age 18 and over, there were 81.8 males.

The median income for a household in the city was $23,623, and for a family was $27,140. Males had a median income of $26,350 versus $17,346 for females. The per capita income for the city was $11,414. About 26.0% of families and 29.0% of the population were below the poverty line, including 34.0% of those under age 18 and 39.1% of those age 65 or over.

Transportation

Highways
 US Highway 57
 US Highway 277
 State Highway 131

Government

Federal representation
The United States Postal Service operates a post office in located at 455 S Bibb Ave.

The United States Border Patrol has two stations in Eagle Pass. The Eagle Pass North Station is at 2285 Del Rio Blvd and the Eagle Pass South Station at 4156 El Indio Hwy.

Eagle Pass is the headquarters of the Kickapoo Traditional Tribe of Texas, a federally recognized tribe of Kickapoo people.

Media
Eagle Pass News Leader
 The News Gram

Notable people

Tres Barrera (born 1994), backup catcher for the Washington Nationals
Rian James (1899–1953), author and screenwriter
Louis Lane (1923–2016) conductor of Cleveland and Atlanta symphonies
Biz Mackey (1897–1965), catcher and manager in Negro League baseball
Robert C. Mathis (1927–2016), retired Air Force four-star general, served as Vice Chief of Staff, U.S. Air Force
Guadalupe Garcia McCall, author and educator
Connie Douglas Reeves (1901–2003), rancher, National Cowgirl Museum and Hall of Fame
Gus Sorola (born 1978), co-founder of Rooster Teeth

HVDC-back-to-back station

In 2000, as part of the power exchange between Texas and Mexico, a high-voltage direct current facility equipped with insulated-gate bipolar transistors was built. This facility, built for Central Power and Light (now AEP Texas) by the ABB Group, operates at a bipolar voltage of 15.9 kV, and has a maximum transfer rate of 36 megawatts. The power station enables AEP to purchase electricity from Mexico's Comisión Federal de Electricidad, when needed.

Tornado

On April 24, 2007, at 7:00 pm CST, a tornado tore through outside of Eagle Pass and caused loss of life and property damage. The community was paralyzed for more than a week. This tornado tore through the southern part of the town, and major damage was done. At the Rosita Valley Elementary school, one child was waiting with his teacher to be picked up and as the dangerous storm approached, the child was picked up and his teacher left the campus too. Minutes later, the school was flattened with nothing to spare. Now the school was rebuilt and children and staff will now live their normal life.

Gallery

See also

Camino Real International Bridge
Eagle Pass – Piedras Negras International Bridge
Fort Duncan
Union Pacific International Railroad Bridge

References

External links

 City website

Populated places established in 1850
Cities in Maverick County, Texas
Mexico–United States border crossings
County seats in Texas
1850 establishments in Texas
Texas populated places on the Rio Grande